Harry Henderson was an actor in theater and films in the United States. He made four films with the Colored Players Film Corporation. He was also cast in several Oscar Micheaux films and had a starring role in the film melodrama The Scar of Shame. He portrays a wealthy concert pianist in the film. He also had a lead role in the 1926 film The Prince of His Race.

Filmography
Uncle Jasper's Will (1922)
The Dungeon (1922)
The Ghost of Tolston's Manor (1923)
The Virgin of Seminole (1923)
Ten Nights in a Barroom (1926) as Willie Hammond, the Judge's  Son
The Prince of His Race (1926) as Tom Beuford
The House Behind the Cedars (1927)
Children of Fate (1928)
The Scar of Shame (1929) as Alvin Hillyard

References

African-American male actors
American male silent film actors
20th-century American male actors
20th-century African-American people